Max Josef Stadler (March 23, 1949 in Passau – May 12, 2013 in Thyrnau) was a German politician. He was a Free Democratic Party member of the Bundestag from 1994 until his death.

References

1949 births
2013 deaths
Members of the Bundestag for Bavaria
People from Passau
Members of the Bundestag 2009–2013
Members of the Bundestag 2005–2009
Members of the Bundestag 2002–2005
Members of the Bundestag 1998–2002
Members of the Bundestag 1994–1998
Members of the Bundestag for the Free Democratic Party (Germany)